Greatest Hits II is a compilation album by American country music artist Kenny Chesney. It was released on May 19, 2009, and it is his second greatest hits album since Greatest Hits in 2000. The album includes twelve singles from 2002 to 2009, as well as two non-singles from previous albums ("Be as You Are" from Be as You Are (Songs from an Old Blue Chair) and "I'm Alive" from Lucky Old Sun). Also included is the new song "Out Last Night", which was issued as a single in April 2009, followed by "I'm Alive" in August 2009.

The album was re-released on February 9, 2010 to include two new tracks, "This Is Our Moment" and "Ain't Back Yet". The former was used by the television network ESPN as a college football theme and peaked at number 46 based on unsolicited airplay, while the latter was released to radio as the album's single in February 2010.

For unknown reasons, several hits, including the number-one singles "Don't Blink", "Better as a Memory", and "Everybody Wants to Go to Heaven" were excluded from this album.

Critical reception
Stephen Thomas Erlewine, reviewing the album for Allmusic, gave it four stars out of five. He said that the album was stronger than his last two studio albums because it did not contain as many laid-back songs. Erlewine also called "Out Last Night" an "amiable day-after shuffle."

Commercial performance
The album debuted at number three on the US Billboard 200 and number one on the US Top Country Albums in its first week of release. On November 27, 2012, the album was certified platinum by the Recording Industry Association of America (RIAA) selling over a million copies in the United States. As of April 2017, the album has sold 1,343,500 copies in the United States.

Track listing

Personnel on "Out Last Night"
 Wyatt Beard - background vocals
 Mark Beckett - drums
 Pat Buchanan - electric guitar
 Kenny Chesney - lead vocals
 Kenny Greenberg - electric guitar
 John Hobbs - Wurlitzer
 Randy McCormick - Hammond B-3 organ
 Larry Paxton - bass guitar
 Scott Vestal - banjo
 John Willis - acoustic guitar

Charts

Weekly charts

Year-end charts

Singles

Certifications

References

2009 greatest hits albums
Kenny Chesney albums
Albums produced by Buddy Cannon
BNA Records compilation albums